The Exeed Yaoguang (瑶光) is a mid-size CUV produced by Exeed a subsidiary of the Chery brand.

Overview 

The Yaoguang is based on the M3X platform developed by Chery with Magna International shared with the slightly smaller Exeed TX from 2017. The price range of the Exeed Yaoguang starts from 167,800 and tops out at 179,800 RMB (24,800 – US$26,600).

The interior of the Exeed Yaoguang is equipped with a 24.6-inch curved dual screen formed with two 12.3-inch screens powered by a Qualcomm Snapdragon 8155 chip and head-up display. Other features include a panoramic sunroof and 14 Sony speakers for the sound system. The backrest of the rear seat can be adjusted electrically by 7 degrees, while the driver seat supports ventilation with heating and has an electrically adjustable footrest and a built-in headrest audio system. The co-pilot seat is also electrically adjustable offering a footrest and supports 5 modes of back massage. In terms of driving assistance systems, the Exeed Yaoguang offers level 2.5 driving assistance system that supports 21 basic and 11 advanced driving assistance functions.

Powertrain
The Exeed Yaoguang is powered by a 2.0-litre TGDI turbo engine that produces 261 hp and 400 Nm, mated to a 7-speed wet dual-clutch gearbox. The Yaoguang comes in two-wheel and four-wheel drive models, with a WLTC fuel consumption of 7.6L/100 km for urban driving and 8.1L/100 km for highways with the drag coefficient being as low as 0.326Cd. The 0 to 100 km/h acceleration time is 8.6 seconds. Seven driving modes would be available and a PHEV version will also be launched later.

References

External links 
 

Exeed Yaoguang
Cars introduced in 2022
Crossover sport utility vehicles
Hybrid electric cars
All-wheel-drive vehicles
2020s cars